Pieria  may refer to:

 Pieria (regional unit) in Greece

 Pieria (Syria), a province of Roman Syria
 Pieria (mythology), the wife of Danaus
 Pieria (Thessaly), ancient city of Thessaly
 Pieria, wife of Oxylus and mother by him of Aetolus
 The Pieria albedo feature on Mercury
 The 'albedo name' of the Mercury region now known as the Derain quadrangle
 Pierian Mountains, a mountain range

See also
Pieres